"The Dingaling Girl" was an American television play broadcast on February 26, 1959 as part of the CBS television series, Playhouse 90.  The cast included Diane Varsi, Eddie Albert, and Mort Sahl. Fielder Cook was the director and J.P. Miller the writer.

Plot
A woman is offered a movie contract but prefers to stay at home with her children. Her husband pressures the woman to act and moves the family to Hollywood where she becomes a star.

Cast
The cast included the following:

 Eddie Albert - Leroy Dawson
 Diane Varsi - Lurene Dawson
 Edward S. Brophy - Gato Barch
 Sam Jaffe -Grandy
 Mort Sahl - Dettering Rohn

Production
The program aired on February 26, 1959, on the CBS television series Playhouse 90. J.P. Miller was the writer and Fielder Cook the director.

References

1959 American television episodes
Playhouse 90 (season 3) episodes
1959 television plays